Ohonica is a small settlement in the Municipality of Borovnica in the Inner Carniola region of Slovenia.

References

External links

Ohonica on Geopedia

Populated places in the Municipality of Borovnica